The sixth season of Futurama originally aired on Comedy Central from June 24, 2010, to September 8, 2011, and consisted of 26 episodes. The season marks the change of networks from Fox to Comedy Central.

The first 13 episodes (known as Season 6-A) aired during 2010, and the remaining 13 episodes (known as Season 6-B) aired during 2011. This makes the episode "The Futurama Holiday Spectacular" the mid-season finale, despite airing almost twelve weeks after Futurama 100th episode. The final episode of the season, "Reincarnation", aired on September 8, 2011 as a three-segment non-canonical special after the official season finale.

The first 13 episodes of the season have been released on a box set called Futurama: Volume 5, on DVD and Blu-ray Disc. It was released in the United States and Canada, on December 21, 2010, and on UK DVD on boxing day 2011. The remaining 13 episodes are available on a box set called Futurama: Volume 6, which was released in the United States and Canada on December 20, 2011. Both volumes have all episodes ordered in production order as was the case with Volumes 1–4.

Production
With the future of the series uncertain at the time of production, the final of the four film releases Into the Wild Green Yonder was designed to stand as the final episode of the Futurama series. However, both Matt Groening and David X. Cohen had expressed a desire to continue the franchise in some form, including as a theatrical film. In an interview with CNN, Groening said that "we have a great relationship with Comedy Central and we would love to do more episodes for them, but I don't know... We're having discussions and there is some enthusiasm but I can't tell if it's just me."

On June 9, 2009, 20th Century Fox announced that Comedy Central had picked up the show for 26 new half-hour episodes that began airing on June 24, 2010. Due to budget concessions, the number of returning writing staff had to be reduced.
Initial voice actor contract talks resulted in a dispute, with 20th Century Fox reportedly refusing to meet the cast's demands for $75,000 per episode. The claim was strenuously denied by members of the cast, and on July 17, 2009 Fox announced that auditions would be held to recast the characters. Groening and Cohen had no part in the discussions, with the former stating "we hope that Fox and the actors can come to an agreement as soon as possible." It was speculated by some in the media that this was merely a ploy in order to get the cast to agree to Fox's offer, citing a similar situation with the cast of The Simpsons as a previous example. The dispute resulted in the voice cast being unable to attend the Futurama booth at Comic Con 2009. However, a deal was struck and on July 31, 2009, it was announced that the full original voice cast would be returning.

Groening, Cohen and the cast expressed extreme optimism for the return of Futurama, with Katey Sagal and Phil LaMarr claiming that the new season's episodes are "hysterical" and "the best yet". Commenting on the revival, Groening revealed that several plots for the upcoming episodes had actually been devised during or even before the original run of the series. Groening has also explained that he had been inspired by J. J. Abrams' Star Trek film, and had even considered rebooting Futurama, before opting for a "rebirth".

"Overclockwise" was originally written to serve as an open-ended series finale, much in the way that the season 4 episode "The Devil's Hands Are Idle Playthings" and the film Into the Wild Green Yonder were produced, in case the show did not get renewed. It was eventually announced on March 24, 2011, that the show was renewed by Comedy Central for a seventh production season.

Episodes 

Comedy Central chose to air the second half of this season out of the intended production order. This list is depicted in production order as this is the order used in Volume 6 and intended by the producers.

Home releases

References

External links 
Season 6 on the Infosphere.

Futurama lists

2010 American television seasons
2011 American television seasons
 
Futurama seasons
Split television seasons